Sir Thomas Miller, 3rd Baronet  (c. 1688–1733) was a British politician who sat in the House of Commons from 1715 to 1727.

Miller was the only son of Sir John Miller, 2nd Baronet and his first wife Margaret Peachey, daughter of John Peachey of Chichester. He matriculated at New College, Oxford on 29 January 1707, aged 18. He married Jane Gother, daughter  of Francis Gother, or Goater, alderman of Chichester.

Miller was returned as Member of Parliament for Chichester in a contest at the 1715 general election and retained  the seat unopposed at the 1722 general election. He did not stand in 1727. In 1717 he strongly opposed the acquittal of former Tory first minister Robert Harley during his Impeachment trial.

Miller succeeded his father in the baronetcy on 29 November 1721.

Miller died on 6 November 1733. He had three sons and one daughter and was succeeded in the baronetcy by his son John.

References

1680s births
1733 deaths
British MPs 1715–1722
British MPs 1722–1727
Members of the Parliament of Great Britain for English constituencies
Baronets in the Baronetage of England